Bagert is a commune in the department of Ariège in the Occitanie region of south-western France.

The inhabitants of the commune are known as Bagertois or Bagertoises.

Geography
Access to the commune is by the D335 road which branches off the D35 east of Betchat and passes through the heart of the commune then continues south-east to join the D3. The commune is predominantly forest with some farmland.

The Ruisseau de Sournet forms the northern border of the commune as it flows west then north to join the Lens. The Ruisseau de Belloc forms part of the south-eastern border of the commune then flows north-west through the south of the commune to eventually join the Lens.

Neighbouring communes and villages

Administration

List of Successive Mayors

Demography
In 2017 the commune had 38 inhabitants.

See also
Communes of the Ariège department

References

External links
Bagert on Géoportail, National Geographic Institute (IGN) website 
Bagert on the 1750 Cassini Map

Communes of Ariège (department)